Televisora Andina de Mérida (shortened to TAM TV) is a television broadcast network owned by Radiodifusora Andina de Mérida, S.A. and based in the city of Mérida in Venezuela. TAM TV was founded in 1982 becoming the first operational regional television network in Venezuela.
In 2006 the network joins TRT, TVO, TVS, Promar TV and Global TV to form the TVR television alliance (Televisión Regional), which broadcasts five more channels on pay TV.

Its current slogan is Tan nuestra como siempre (Spanish for as ours as always).

See also
Media of Venezuela

External links
Official site.

Television channels and stations established in 1982
Television networks in Venezuela
Television stations in Venezuela
1982 establishments in Venezuela
Mass media in Mérida, Mérida